Griggstown may refer to:
Griggstown, New Jersey
Griggstown Quail Farm